Michael Buchanan, better known as House Shoes, is an American Detroit-born hip hop producer and DJ, who lives and works in Los Angeles, California. He served as a producer on albums by Phat Kat, Proof, Elzhi, Pumpkinhead, Marv Won, J Dilla, Danny Brown, and Quelle Chris among others. He is a three-time Detroit Music Awards winner for Outstanding Hip-Hop DJ (from 2005 to 2007).

Career
Buchanan grew up in Lathrup Village. He went to Southfield-Lathrup High School and Eastern Michigan University.

He was a resident deejay at the hip hop staple St. Andrews Hall from 1994–2004. He worked at a number of record stores, including Melodies & Memories, Street Corner Music and later also worked as a manager for Fat Beats.

As a DJ, Buchanan has toured extensively throughout the U.S. and Europe with artists Guilty Simpson, Illa J, Exile, Aloe Blacc, Percee P, Phat Kat, Slum Village and Elzhi, to name a few, as well as on his own. But he has garnered the respect of acts far outside the scope of Detroit hip-hop. Most recently, Buchanan performed as tour DJ on Mayer Hawthorne & The County's Spring 2010 16-city headlining tour.

House Shoes founded Street Corner Music in 2013.

Discography

Studio albums
Let It Go (2012)

Compilation albums
The House Shoes Collection Vol.1 : I Got Next (2004)
House Shoes & Street Corner Music Present: The Gift Vol. 7 (2015)
The Makings (2016)

Extended plays
Do-Over Vol. 1 10", (2010) w/ Flying Lotus
Los Angeles 4/10 10", (2010) w/ Jordan Rockswell
Crown Nation EP, (2011) w/ Quelle Chris
The Time EP, (2012)

Instrumental albums
Let It Go Instrumentals (2012)

Mixtapes
The King James Version: Chapter 1, Verses 1–5 (2009)

Hosted & unsorted
Jay Dee Unreleased, 1997
Elzhi – Out Of Focus EP, 1998
Phat Kat - Dedication To The Suckers 12", 1999
Loungin' Vol. 1 : Live at the Buddha Lounge, 2005
NowOn – Don't Call It A Mixtape w/ Haircut aka Mayer Hawthorne, 2008
J1's Starship 27 Volume 2 (compilation): Castles, 2011
Behind Closed Doors 45: Purist, 2012

Awards and nominations 

!
|-
|align=center|2005
|rowspan="3"| Himself
|rowspan="3"| Detroit Music Award for Outstanding Outstanding Hip-Hop DJ
|
|rowspan="2"| 
|-
|align=center|2006
|
|-
|align=center|2007
|
|
|-

References

External links
Myspace
Certified hip hop interview

American DJs
Living people
Businesspeople from Detroit
Musicians from Detroit
Midwest hip hop musicians
American hip hop record producers
Year of birth missing (living people)
People from Oakland County, Michigan